

La Ultra 
La Ultra is an Ultramarathon and running event held in the Ladakh region of Indian Administered Kashmir. The marathon subjects participants to extreme climate, distances of up to 555 kms, and altitudes of up 17,500ft and is deemed one of the toughest runs in the world.

The race consists of multiple categories ranging form a welcoming 11km run to a forbidding 555km ordeal. All races begin at high altitudes and involve steep ascents and descents, making this race particularly grueling. However, it is the altitude that sets this race apart from others. The 111 km ultra marathon finishes at an altitude of 5,359 meters (17,582 feet), and the 222 km ultra marathon takes runners to the world's highest motorable pass at an altitude of 5,602 meters (18,379 feet).

Due to the extreme conditions of the race, the LaUltra marathon is only open to experienced ultra runners who have completed other challenging races and have received medical clearance. Runners must also undergo acclimatization training to prepare for the high altitude.

The LaUltra marathon was founded in 2010 by Dr. Rajat Chauhan, an ultrarunner and sports physician, and is now in its twelfth year. The race has gained a reputation as one of the most challenging and prestigious ultra marathons in the world. The small number of participants each year, coupled with the demanding course, make this race a true test of endurance and resilience.

In addition to being a challenging race, the LaUltra marathon also promotes sustainable tourism in the region. The race is held in the Ladakh region of India, which is known for its stunning natural beauty and unique culture. The organizers of the LaUltra marathon work with local communities to ensure that the race has a positive impact on the region and its people.

The LaUltra marathon is an incredible feat of endurance, attracting runners from around the world to test their limits in the stunning and challenging terrain of the Indian Himalayas. While the race is not for the faint of heart, it offers a unique opportunity to experience the beauty of this region and push oneself to the limit.

References 

Ultramarathons